A blanet is a member of a hypothetical class of exoplanets that orbit black holes.

Blanets are fundamentally similar to planets; they have enough mass to be rounded by their own gravity, but are not massive enough to start thermonuclear fusion, just like planets that orbit stars. In 2019, a team of astronomers and exoplanetologists showed that there is a safe zone around a supermassive black hole that could harbor thousands of blanets in orbit around it.

Etymology 
The team led by Keiichi Wada of Kagoshima University in Japan has given this name to black hole planets. The word is a portmanteau of black hole and planet.

Formation 
Blanets are suspected to form in the accretion disk that orbits a sufficiently large black hole.

In fiction 
In Interstellar (2014), the three terrestrial planets orbiting supermassive black hole Garguantua are proper blanets.

References 

Exoplanetology
Hypothetical planet types
Black holes
2020 neologisms